Sunawar Sukowati (EVO: Soenawar Soekawati; 6 September 1922 – 12 January 1986) was an Indonesian politician from Central Java, who served as the third chairman of the Indonesian Democratic Party from 1980 until 1986. Prior to serving as party chairman, he served as minister of State for People's Welfare and minister of National Development.

Biography
According to Sunawar Sukowati in 1983:

In 1983, he sparked latent controversy by informing his colleagues in the Indonesian Democratic Party faction that the Pancasila state, as mentioned in Suharto's presidential speech, is a secular state. He argues that this view is inferred from the fact that Indonesia is not a religious state, and religious authority is separated from state authority. His opinion was approved by K.H Hasbullah Bakry and Abdurrahman Wahid.

References

Sources 
 

1922 births
1986 deaths
Government ministers of Indonesia
People from Surakarta